Lindsay Lohan's Beach Club is an American reality television series that ran from January 8 to March 25, 2019 on MTV, starring American actress and businesswoman, Lindsay Lohan. The series follows Lohan as she expands her business empire and manages her beach club in Mykonos, Greece, with partner, Panos Spentzos, and focuses on the lives of the staff at the club, who were flown from America for a summer and work to remain ambassadors for the Lohan brand. It received mixed reception, with most criticism centering around Lohan's lack of screen time, which had been a deliberate decision by Lohan, as she disclosed during the promotional press tour for the series. In June 2019, it was reported that the show would not be returning for a second season.

Background
In October 2016, Lohan opened her first nightclub, in collaboration with her business partner Dennis Papageorgiou, named Lohan Nightclub, in Athens, Greece. In May 2018, she opened a club on the Greek island Mykonos called Lohan Beach House Mykonos and later her second beach club on Ialysos Beach, Rhodes, called Lohan Beach House Rhodes. In July 2018, it was revealed Lohan and MTV were producing a "Vanderpump Rules-style" reality series set at Lohan Beach House Mykonos. Later that month, MTV released a first look at the series. The diurnal club, located at the Kalo Livadi beach, was curated by Lohan after previously licensing her name to the Lohan brand, stating: "There's a business side to my life now, but I'm not in America, so no one knows about it, which is nice for me." "I really wanted to make it a family-style beach. A place where people can go with their kids and feel safe," she elaborated on the venture. She also recalled a highly  publicized  domestic abuse incident she suffered on a Mykonos beach as the catalyst, "The last thing I was going to  do was keep that memory [and] not make something better of it; so that's why I decided to  take over the beach." During an interview with The Times in August 2018, Lohan's partner in the Beach House business, Panagiotis Spentzos, stated her name was responsible for the brand's success in Europe and the Middle East. In early September 2018, a clip of Lohan dancing during production of the show filmed by a bystander and shared online went viral under the hashtag #DoTheLilo, inspiring replica dances, memes and fan art. Lohan explained she agreed to do the show because, unlike with her previous Lindsay docuseries, she would now be directing, "I'm the boss."

Development and promotion
In December 2018, MTV announced Lindsay Lohan's Beach Club would be premiering in the United States on January 8, 2019, and would roll out globally across Viacom's international network of MTV channels in nearly 180 countries. A trailer was also released along with the show's premise which would allow viewers "to see a new side of Lohan as she calls the shots with her handpicked team of young and ambitious VIP hosts who will have to do whatever it takes to secure Lohan's name as the definition of vacation luxury." A sneak peek of the series, "Lindsay Lohan: Welcome to the Beach Club," giving viewers an introduction to the cast, who were flown in to work at the club from America for a summer, aired on January 1, 2019, on MTV. While talking about the show, Lohan said: "We were all very clear that it wasn't going to be a Lindsay Lohan follow-her-every-second kind of show. It was going to be me running a business. It's different because I'm writing the script, in a sense," continuing, "I have nothing to hide. What's left in saying that I've gone to a club? Now I own them." The cast attended a premiere party in New York City on January 7. A special titled "Growing Up Lohan" documenting Lohan's career and past MTV appearances, hosted by her siblings Aliana and Dakota, premiered on MTV on January 7, 2019. After the premiere episode, the network aired an after-show with Lohan and hosted by her Mean Girls co-star Jonathan Bennett.

Nina L. Diaz, MTV's president of programming and development, explained the show came about after a talent executive read that Lohan was opening the beach club in Mykonos and immediately brought it to MTV executives, "MTV called to find out if she'd consider and the response came back so positive. [...] That call happened in May and we were shooting by summer." Diaz stated that Lohan was heavily involved in the creative process of developing the series, "Twenty-four-seven, she wanted to know what was happening with them — if there was a conflict or issues — she wanted to be kept abreast and she would come down to the house to talk about something." Lohan, the beach club staff and production team, Bunim/Murray, were all living in villas next to each other during the filming throughout the summer of 2018.

Future
As of June 2019, Lohan had decided to sell the property to cash in on the investment and the beach club in Mykonos was closed. MTV had reportedly been "trying to make something work" for a second season, but Lohan was not interested at the time. Cast member Mike Mulderrig would later reveal in an interview that the series had a five season deal, and filming for the second season was set to start in the summer 2019 but the plans were scrapped after Lohan's decision to sell the club. The beach club was relocated to Alimos for the 2019 summer season under the name Lohan Seaside, closer to Lohan Nightclub in Athens so they could alternate seasonally, as a message on its official website informed. In a statement to Newsday, Lohan said: "The show was moving into a new direction. Perhaps not enough drama in my life for [a] reality-TV formula (as that's not where I am in my life). As for the club, we are simply moving the focus to a brand-new and exciting location in Athens, and also a new location and partnership to be announced in Mykonos."

Lohan Seaside was then featured on the twelfth season of The Real Housewives of Atlanta with Panos Spentzos making an appearance. In April 2020, Lohan was asked about the status of the series and her clubs, replying: "When we did that show it was really good to tie in with the opening of the beach, we still have two [clubs] in Athens and we've been discussing what's gonna go on in Mykonos... now is not really the time to talk about it [due to COVID-19]. But we'll see, I still do have my Lohan clubs, and I still do want to open more [...] so there's all that in discussion." The Lohan Beach House Mykonos reopened for the 2020 summer season on July 1, 2020, according to its official website and social media activity, while respecting COVID-19 prevention measures.

Cast
 Lindsay Lohan
 Panos Spentzos

Ambassadors
 Gabi Andrews
 Billy Estevez
 Brent Marks
 Aristotle Polites
 Sara Tariq
 Jonitta Wallace
 Mike Mulderrig
 Jules Wilson
 May Yassine
 Alex Moffitt
 Kailah Casillas
 Kyle Marvé

Cast duration

Table Key
 = Ambassador arrives
 = Ambassador is featured in this episode
 = Ambassador is fired
 = Ambassador is re-hired
 = Ambassador is selected to officially join the Lohan brand

Episodes

Specials

Reception

Ratings
Lindsay Lohan's Beach Club'''s premiere ranked as one of the top five new cable shows of the 2018–19 season among young adults and was considered "another win for MTV" by Billboard. According to Nielsen, the launch delivered triple digit growth across MTV's key demos. MTV also saw substantial increases for the series viewership with delayed viewing. By the final episode, the rating was considered "steady".

Critical response
The series received mixed to negative reviews from critics. On the review aggregator website Rotten Tomatoes, it has an approval rating of 27% based on 15 reviews, with an average rating of 4.5/10. The website's critical consensus reads, "Lindsay Lohan's Beach Club lacks the trashy joie de vivre of similar reality shows in large part because of the titular character's lack of screen time." Metacritic, which uses a weighted average, assigned a score of 45 out of 100 based on 6 critics, indicating "mixed or average reviews". Daniel D'Addario of Variety stated that the "new MTV reality series Lindsay Lohan’s Beach Club is an accidental success" as the focus on the lives of the staff "falls flat" but, "as a psychological portrait of the paparazzi magnet-turned-aspiring hospitality magnate Lohan, it’s juicily riveting." Writing for The Hollywood Reporter, Robyn Bahr claimed the series is "visually ugly, the fuzzy camera unable to capture the lusciousness of the seaside or the tranquility of Mediterranean architecture," and that "Lohan, at least, comes off as emotionally intelligent with her staff, her deep, flinty voice and confident HBIC aura a welcome break from the participants' acrid attention-seeking." 

Willa Paskin of Slate considered the series "halfhearted" due to Lohan trying to star in a reality TV show "without touching the thing with a 10-foot pole," continuing, "Lohan is the series' title character, but she is not the protagonist. [...] The most interesting thing about Beach House is the extent to which Lohan's tabloid past is treated as though it were actually a reality show, the equivalent of Lisa Vanderpump's Real Housewives." Verne Gay from Newsday also described it as "the Real Housewives meets Temptation Island" with an "unexpected, and welcome, twist — Lohan is more or less the mature presence." The Daily Beast's Amy Zimmerman commented it's "great on paper, but in practice, the show faces a number of insurmountable obstacles that make it almost unwatchable," echoing most critics displeasure for the lack of focus on Lohan, "First and foremost: This Lindsay Lohan show is barely about Lindsay Lohan. [...] Without its supposed star, all that remains is a reality TV show that barely bothers to have a premise." Decider's Lea Palmieri said: "Watching [Lohan] in a position of authority, while it's the others that hustle and grovel around her, feels triumphant," concluding, "Many will write off Lindsay Lohan's Beach Club'' as trashy reality show, and others will wisely accept and appreciate it for that fact."

Accolades

References

External links

Lohan Beach House Mykonos

2010s American reality television series
2019 American television series debuts
2019 American television series endings
Lindsay Lohan
MTV reality television series
Mykonos
Television shows set in Greece
Television series based on singers and musicians
Television series by Bunim/Murray Productions